The Law for Temporary Measures concerning University Management (大学の運営に関する臨時措置法, Daigaku no Un'ei ni Kansuru Rinjisochihō) of Japan was passed as Law No. 70 on August 7, 1969. It specified urgent measures to normalize management of universities disrupted by the 1968–69 Japanese university protests. The law was repealed in 2001.

External links 
 Latest Text (Nakano Bunko, in Japanese)

References

Japanese legislation
1969 in law
Education laws and guidelines in Japan